Sărmășag Coal Mine is an open-pit mining exploitation, one of the largest in Romania located in Sărmășag, Sălaj County with estimated coal reserves of 10.6 million tonnes. The legal entity managing the Sărmășag mine is the Ploieşti National Coal Company which was set up in 1957.

References

Coal mines in Romania